Lucas Fernando Banegas (born 18 December 1979) is an Argentine professional footballer who plays as a defender for Comunicaciones.

Career
Banegas played for Deportivo Merlo in Primera C Metropolitana between 2003 and 2004, featuring in a total of forty matches whilst scoring three times. In 2004, Comunicaciones signed Banegas. He remained for five years, with his first campaign concluding with promotion to Primera B Metropolitana. Banegas moved across the third tier to Tristán Suárez in 2009. Seven appearances followed, with Banegas subsequently spending twelves months back with Comunicaciones. In January 2012, Banegas joined Nueva Chicago. They won promotion from the 2011–12 Primera B Metropolitana, as the defender scored once in thirty-six games.

After netting goals against Huracán and Defensa y Justicia in Primera B Nacional, Banegas rejoined Comunicaciones for a third spell on 4 July 2013. He appeared one hundred and seventy-five times across the succeeding six seasons, while also scoring twenty-five goals for the Agronomía outfit; which included braces over UAI Urquiza and Fénix.

Career statistics
.

Honours
Comunicaciones
Primera C Metropolitana: 2004–05

References

External links

1979 births
Living people
Footballers from Buenos Aires
Argentine footballers
Association football defenders
Primera C Metropolitana players
Primera B Metropolitana players
Primera Nacional players
Deportivo Merlo footballers
Club Comunicaciones footballers
CSyD Tristán Suárez footballers
Nueva Chicago footballers